Aliceres Mango (died 1992) was an Angolan politician and general secretary for UNITA.

He was killed in the Halloween massacre.

References

Year of birth missing
1992 deaths

UNITA politicians